Sunanda Tripathi-Manteris (born June 20, 1962) is an Indian-born American account executive and former journalist at the NBC affiliate in Las Vegas, Nevada, KSNV-DT.

Manteris was raised in Littleton, Colorado, a suburb of Denver, where she attended Columbine High School. She went on to receive a Bachelor of Arts degree in Mass Communications in 1985 from Colorado State University Pueblo.

In 1984, she began her broadcasting career as a disc jockey at KDZA and Z-100 in Southern Colorado, including a transfer to the News Department where she did “morning drive” newscasts. She began working in television in 1985 as a reporter and weekend anchor at KCWY-TV in Casper, Wyoming. She later moved to work in TV news positions at KULR-TV in Billings, Montana and WWAY-TV in Wilmington, North Carolina. Manteris moved to Las Vegas in early 1989 when she joined the NBC affiliate, Channel 3 (KSNV-DT), as a news anchor. She continued this position for 22 years until June 10, 2011 when her contract expired.

As a result of allegations of ethnic, gender and age discrimination, a Federal lawsuit was filed in U.S. District Court in Nevada on May 17, 2011 on her behalf. On April 2, 2012, Judge Gloria Navarro put the lawsuit on hold and ordered Manteris to resolve the lawsuit against the station through arbitration.

During her broadcasting years, her industry honors and commendations include multiple Electronic Media Awards for “Best Anchor.” She was also honored as a finalist for Emmy Award for “Hooked on Hookah.” Manteris is a founding member and currently an officer in “Las Vegas-India Chamber of Commerce” and member of “Friends of India.” Manteris is married and has one son; she lives in Boulder City, Nevada.

Manteris is a supporter of the Leukemia & Lymphoma Society of Southern Nevada. Her 12-year-old grandson died in March 2018 from acute myeloid leukemia.

Awards and nominations
 2010, nominated for Pacific Southwest Regional Emmy Award for her work at KVBC (now KSNV)

Personal life
Tripathi-Manteris is married to Arthur Manteris, Vice President of Station Casinos.

References

External links
  (Alternate)
 
 

1962 births
Living people
American accountants
Women accountants
American writers of Indian descent
American women television journalists
Colorado State University Pueblo alumni
Columbine High School alumni
Journalists from Las Vegas
People from Boulder City, Nevada
Television anchors from Las Vegas
21st-century American women